Gert Steegmans (born 30 September 1980 in Hasselt) is a Belgian former professional road bicycle racer who last rode for UCI ProTeam . He was noted for a strong finishing sprint and could compete in the sprint with fellow Belgian cyclist, and teammate, Tom Boonen.

Career overview
Although Steegmans was already known in Belgium, he gained more popularity outside Belgium as he piloted Robbie McEwen to two stage wins during the 2006 Tour de France.

During the second stage of the 2007 Tour de France, a Liquigas rider fell sideways in the last 3 kilometres causing others to fall. Around 20 riders fell blocking the entire road and leaving approximately 30 riders to sprint for the victory, eventually taken by Steegmans in his home country ahead of his compatriot and teammate Tom Boonen, who took over the green jersey by coming second in the stage.

In the Tour de France, he won the prestigious stage at Champs-Élysées.

Steegmans made headlines in the weeks leading up to the 2009 Tour de France with his refusal to sign an anti-doping agreement which Team Katusha was trying to get all its riders to sign. The agreement called for any rider who tested positive for a doping substance to pay a fine of five times their annual salary. Steegmans persisted in his refusal even after an ultimatum handed down by the team, which resulted in his not being selected for Katusha's Tour de France squad. Katusha and Steegmans dissolved his contract on 5 August after Steegmans' continuing refusal to sign the anti-doping charter. Team RadioShack announced that he would be joining the team in 2010 starting with the Tour Down Under in late January.

On 7 March 2010, during the time-trial for the Paris–Nice race, he was injured in a whirlwind accident, breaking a collarbone.

After struggling with injuries, he announced his immediate retirement in July 2015.

Personal
Steegmans is married to former runway model and Tour de France podium girl Laura Leturgie, and they have one child, daughter Maélya (born on 6 June 2011).

Major results

1996
 1st  National Under-17 Road Race Championships
1998
 1st  National Under-19 Time Trial Championships
2000
 4th GP Wielerrevue
 7th Hasselt–Spa–Hasselt
2002
 1st  National Under-23 Time Trial Championships
 1st Zesbergenprijs Harelbeke
 8th Hasselt–Spa–Hasselt
2003
 8th Rund um den Flughafen Köln/Bonn
2004
 5th Grote Prijs Jef Scherens
2005
 1st Nationale Sluitingsprijs
 1st Stage 1 Tour de Picardie
 6th Overall Circuit Franco-Belge
2006
 1st Stage 2 Tour de Picardie
 1st Stage 3 Four Days of Dunkirk
 2nd Overall Volta ao Algarve
1st Stages 3 & 4
 3rd Scheldeprijs
 5th Overall Tour of Belgium
1st Stage 5
 6th Doha GP
 6th Omloop Het Volk
 6th Kuurne–Brussels–Kuurne
2007
 1st Overall Circuit Franco-Belge
1st Stages 2 & 4
 1st Tour de Rijke
 1st Stage 2 Tour de France
 1st Stage 1 Volta ao Algarve
 1st Stage 3 Three Days of De Panne
 1st Stage 4 Four Days of Dunkirk
 1st Stage 1 (TTT) Tour of Qatar
 3rd Scheldeprijs
 5th Kuurne–Brussels–Kuurne
2008
 Paris–Nice
1st Stages 1 & 2
 1st Stage 21 Tour de France
 1st Stage 2 Four Days of Dunkirk
 1st Memorial Rik Van Steenbergen
 1st Trofeo Calvià
 1st Profronde van Friesland
 1st Halle–Ingooigem
 2nd Paris–Brussels
 3rd Trofeo Cala Millor
 4th Trofeo Mallorca
2009
 1st Stage 2 Vuelta a Andalucía
 1st Trofeo Mallorca
2010
 3rd Paris–Tours
 4th Binche–Tournai–Binche
 8th Kampioenschap van Vlaanderen
 9th Overall Circuit Franco-Belge
2011
 1st Nokere Koerse
 10th Overall Tour of Qatar
2012
 4th Overall Tour of Qatar
2014
 3rd Overall Three Days of De Panne
 4th Nokere Koerse

References

External links

Belgian male cyclists
Belgian Tour de France stage winners
Tour de France Champs Elysées stage winners
Flemish sportspeople
1980 births
Living people
Sportspeople from Hasselt
Cyclists from Limburg (Belgium)